Tab (stylized as TaB) was a diet cola soft drink created and produced by The Coca-Cola Company, introduced in 1963 and discontinued in 2020. Coca-Cola's first diet drink, Tab was popular throughout the 1960s and 1970s. Several variations were made, including a number of fruit-flavored, root beer, and ginger ale versions. Caffeine-free and clear variations were released in the late 1980s and early 1990s.

Following studies in the early 1970s that linked saccharin, Tab's main sweetener, with bladder cancer in rats, the United States Congress mandated warning labels on products containing the sweetener. The label requirement was later repealed when no plausibility was found for saccharin causing cancer in humans.

Tab's popularity declined after the Coca-Cola company's introduction of Diet Coke in 1982, though it remained the best-selling diet soda of that year. Coca-Cola continued to produce Tab in the United States, though in considerably smaller quantities than its more popular mainstay beverages, such as Coca-Cola and Diet Coke. According to the company, three million cases of Tab were made in 2011, and the beverage retained a cult following. In 2006, a Tab-branded energy drink was released, though it used a different formula from the standard cola. Coca-Cola discontinued Tab at the end of 2020.

History
Tab was created in 1963 by Coca-Cola after the successful sales and marketing of Diet Rite cola, owned by The Royal Crown Company. Previously, Diet Rite had been the only sugarless soda on the market. Tab was marketed to consumers who wanted to "keep tabs" on their weight.

Coca-Cola's marketing research department used its IBM 1401 computer to generate a list of over 185,000 four-letter words with one vowel, adding names suggested by the company's own staff; the list was stripped of any words deemed unpronounceable or too similar to existing trademarks. Of a final list of about twenty names, "Tabb" was chosen, influenced by the possible play on words, and shortened to "Tab" during development. Packaging designer Robert Sidney Dickens gave the name the capitalization pattern ("TaB") used in the logo as well as creating a new bottle design for the soft drink.

For a time in the 1970s, Coca-Cola introduced six variety flavors of Tab (all of which were also sugar-free): Root Beer, Lemon-Lime, Ginger Ale, Black Cherry, Strawberry, and Orange. A caffeine-free version of the original Tab flavor was introduced in 1983, alongside caffeine-free versions of Coca-Cola and Diet Coke. Tab Clear, a caramel color-free version of Tab, was released in the United States in 1992, and subsequently in the United Kingdom and Japan. Tab Clear was discontinued in 1994.

In 2006, Coca-Cola introduced Tab Energy. Though it shares the Tab branding, its formula is entirely different from that of the standard cola: it is sweetened with sucralose and has a sour, tart flavor.

Saccharin safety debate

Tab was reformulated several times. It was initially sweetened with a mixture of cyclamate and saccharin. After the Food and Drug Administration (FDA) issued a ban on cyclamate in 1969, sodium saccharin was used as the beverage's primary sweetener.

Studies on laboratory rats during the early 1970s linked high volumes of cyclamate and saccharin with the development of bladder cancer. As a result, the United States Congress mandated that further studies of saccharin be performed and required that all food containing saccharin bear a label warning that the sweetener had been shown to cause cancer in laboratory animals. Despite this, Tab remained commercially successful and was the best-selling diet soda in 1982. In May 1984, Coca-Cola introduced Nutrasweet into the Tab formula, which alienated a significant portion of its market, and resulted in numerous consumer complaints regarding a perceived change in flavor.

In the absence of further evidence that saccharin caused cancer in humans, the substance was delisted in 2000 from the U.S. National Toxicology Program’s Report on Carcinogens; this led to the repealing of the warning label requirements for products containing saccharin. In December 2010, the United States Environmental Protection Agency removed saccharin from its list of hazardous substances.

Availability
Tab's popularity began to decline in 1982 with the introduction of Diet Coke, although Tab retained something of a cult following in the United States, where customers purchased about 3 million cases in 2008. In 2011, the Coca-Cola Company reported that it produced approximately 3 million cases of Tab that year (in contrast to 885 million cases of Diet Coke). John Sicher, editor of Beverage Digest, commented in 2013: 

The product is also available in the United States Virgin Islands, the Southern African Customs Union, Norway (under the name Tab X-Tra), Canada, and Spain. 

Tab was available in Australia in the 1960s to 1980s. It was also sold in the United Kingdom from the late 1970s to the mid-1990s.

As part of their efforts to scale back on under-performing brands during the COVID-19 pandemic, in October 2020 Coca-Cola announced that it was discontinuing Tab, along with Coca-Cola Life, Delaware Punch, Diet Coke Feisty Cherry, Northern Neck Ginger Ale, Diet Northern Neck Ginger Ale, Odwalla and Zico.

As of June 2021, Tab was still available at Coca-Cola stores in Atlanta, Orlando, and Las Vegas and select Georgia locations.

In early 2021, a group of Tab soda fans created the Save Tab Soda Committee.

Variants

References

External links

 
 Save Tab Soda Committee

Caffeinated soft drinks
Carbonated drinks
Coca-Cola cola brands
Diet drinks
Discontinued soft drinks
Products introduced in 1963
Products and services discontinued in 2020